2H+ (sometimes 2Hplus or 2H-positive) is a Slovak hip hop group from Bratislava, formed in 2001.

History 
The band was formed around 2001 by Suvereno (then known as MCL), Cigo, Vladis and DJ Wugy. Cigo left the group to join the Petržalka group H16 and DJ Wugy to the group Rendeska.SK.

Discography

Studio albums 
 2005: Taktomalobyťataktobude
 2007: Premium

EP's 
 2006: Bar Element

Singles 
 2010: Vladis - Evolúcia (mixtape)
 2010: Vladis - Generácia (2CD) (album)
 2010: Suvereno - Král vs Joker (album)
 2011: Vladis - Fénix (mixtape)
 2011: Pery, Bonano, Vladis - Pery Bonano Vladis (mixtape)
 2011: Suvereno - Zlatá stredná cesta (mixtape)
 2012: Suvereno - Alchymista (album)
 2012: Vladis - Svet nie je pre chudobných (album)

References 

Musical groups established in 2001
Slovak hip hop musicians